Stephan Vujčić (born 3 January 1986) is a German professional footballer who most recently played for USC Paloma.

Career
Vujčić was born in Hamburg. He has previously played for the youth team of Hamburger SV and in senior career he played for Holstein Kiel, FK Rabotnički and KF Shkëndija. He made his professional debut in 2009, when Kiel beat Werder Bremen II 4–0.

After nearly five years in North Macedonia, Vujčić returned to Germany and joined USC Paloma in March 2020.

References

External links

Profile at Macedonian Football 

1986 births
Living people
German people of Croatian descent
Footballers from Hamburg
German footballers
Association football midfielders
Hamburger SV players
3. Liga players
Macedonian First Football League players
Croatian Football League players
First Football League (Croatia) players
Holstein Kiel II players
Holstein Kiel players
FK Rabotnički players
NK Inter Zaprešić players
KF Shkëndija players
FK Shkupi players
FK Belasica players
USC Paloma players
German expatriate footballers
German expatriate sportspeople in North Macedonia
Expatriate footballers in North Macedonia